Terabit Ethernet or TbE is Ethernet with speeds above 100 Gigabit Ethernet. 400 Gigabit Ethernet (400G, 400GbE) and 200 Gigabit Ethernet (200G, 200GbE) standards developed by the IEEE P802.3bs Task Force using broadly similar technology to 100 Gigabit Ethernet were approved on December 6, 2017.  In 2016, several networking equipment suppliers were already offering proprietary solutions for 200G and 400G.

The Ethernet Alliance's 2022 technology roadmap expects speeds of 800 Gbit/s and 1.6 Tbit/s to become an IEEE standard between about 2023 and 2025. Doubling to 800 GbE is expected to occur after 112 Gbit/s SerDes become available. The Optical Internetworking Forum (OIF) has already announced five new projects at 112 Gbit/s which would also make 4th generation (single-lane) 100 GbE links possible. The IEEE P802.3df Task Force started work in January 2022 to standardize 800 Gbit/s and 1.6 Tbit/s Ethernet.

History 
Facebook and Google, among other companies, have expressed a need for TbE. While a speed of 400 Gbit/s is achievable with existing technology, 1 Tbit/s (1000 Gbit/s) would require different technology. Accordingly, at the IEEE Industry Connections Higher Speed Ethernet Consensus group meeting in September 2012, 400 GbE was chosen as the next generation goal. Additional 200 GbE objectives were added in January 2016.

The University of California, Santa Barbara (UCSB) attracted help from  Agilent Technologies, Google, Intel, Rockwell Collins, and Verizon Communications to help with research into next generation Ethernet.

As of early 2016, chassis/modular based core router platforms from Cisco, Juniper and other major manufacturers support 400 Gbit/s full duplex data rates per slot. One, two and four port 100 GbE and one port 400 GbE line cards are presently available. As of early 2019, 200 GbE line cards became available after 802.3cd standard ratification.

200G Ethernet uses PAM4 signaling which allows 2 bits to be transmitted per clock cycle, but at a higher implementation cost.

Standards development 
The IEEE formed the "IEEE 802.3 Industry Connections Ethernet Bandwidth Assessment Ad Hoc", to investigate the business needs for short and long term bandwidth requirements.

IEEE 802.3's "400 Gb/s Ethernet Study Group" started working on the 400 Gbit/s generation standard in March 2013. Results from the study group were published and approved on March 27, 2014. Subsequently, the IEEE 802.3bs Task Force started working to provide physical layer specifications for several link distances.

The IEEE 802.3bs standard was approved on December 6, 2017 and is available online.

The IEEE 802.3cd standard was approved on December 5, 2018.

The IEEE 802.3cn standard was approved on December 20, 2019.

The IEEE 802.3cm standard was approved on January 30, 2020.

The IEEE 802.3cu standard was approved on February 11, 2021.

The IEEE 802.3ck and 802.3db standards were approved on September 21, 2022.

In November 2022 the IEEE 802.3df project objectives were split in two, with 1.6T and 200G/lane work being moved to the new IEEE 802.3dj project
 Original IEEE P802.3df Objectives
 Updated IEEE P802.3df Objectives to reduce scope to 800G Ethernet using 100G physical lanes
 IEEE P802.3dj Objectives for 1.6Tbit/s Ethernet and PHYs that employ 200Gbit/s lanes

IEEE project objectives 
Like all speeds since 10 Gigabit Ethernet, the standards support only full-duplex operation. Other objectives include:
 Support MAC data rates of 400 Gbit/s and 200 Gbit/s
 Preserve the Ethernet frame format utilizing the Ethernet MAC
 Preserve minimum and maximum frame size of current Ethernet standard
 Support a bit error ratio (BER) of 10−13, which is an improvement over the 10−12 BER that was specified for 10GbE, 40GbE, and 100GbE.
 Support for OTN (transport of Ethernet across optical transport networks), and optional support for Energy-Efficient Ethernet (EEE).

802.3bs project 
Define physical layer specifications supporting:
 400 Gbit/s Ethernet
 at least 100 m over multi-mode fiber (400GBASE-SR16) using sixteen parallel strands of fiber each at 25 Gbit/s
 at least 500 m over single-mode fiber (400GBASE-DR4) using four parallel strands of fiber each at 100 Gbit/s
 at least 2 km over single-mode fiber (400GBASE-FR8) using eight parallel wavelengths (CWDM) each at 50 Gbit/s
 at least 10 km over single-mode fiber (400GBASE-LR8) using eight parallel wavelengths (CWDM) each at 50 Gbit/s
 eight and sixteen lane chip-to-chip/chip-to-module electrical interfaces (400GAUI-8 and 400GAUI-16)
 200 Gbit/s Ethernet
 at least 500 m over single-mode fiber (200GBASE-DR4) using four parallel strands of fiber each at 50 Gbit/s
 at least 2 km over single-mode fiber (200GBASE-FR4) using four parallel wavelengths (CWDM) each at 50 Gbit/s
 at least 10 km over single-mode fiber (200GBASE-LR4) using four parallel wavelengths (CWDM) each at 50 Gbit/s
 four and eight lane chip-to-chip/chip-to-module electrical interfaces (200GAUI-4 and 200GAUI-8)

802.3cd project 
 Define four-lane 200	Gbit/s PHYs for operation over:
 copper twin-axial cables with lengths up to at least 3 m (200GBASE-CR4).
 printed circuit board backplane with a total channel insertion loss of ≤ 30 dB at 13.28125 GHz (200GBASE-KR4).
 Define 200 Gbit/s PHYs for operation over MMF with lengths up to at least 100 m (200GBASE-SR4).

802.3ck project 
 200 Gbit/s Ethernet
 Define a two-lane 200 Gbit/s Attachment Unit interface (AUI) for chip-to-module applications, compatible with PMDs based on 100 Gbit/s per lane optical signaling (200GAUI-2 C2M)
 Define a two-lane 200 Gbit/s Attachment Unit Interface (AUI) for chip-to-chip applications (200GAUI-2 C2C)
 Define a two-lane 200 Gbit/s PHY for operation over electrical backplanes an insertion loss ≤ 28 dB at 26.56 GHz (200GBASE-KR2)
 Define a two-lane 200 Gbit/s PHY for operation over twin axial copper cables with lengths up to at least 2 m (200GBASE-CR2)
 400 Gbit/s Ethernet

 Define a four-lane 400 Gbit/s Attachment Unit interface (AUI) for chip-to-module applications, compatible with PMDs based on 100 Gbit/s per lane optical signaling (400GAUI-4 C2M)
 Define a four-lane 400 Gbit/s Attachment Unit Interface (AUI) for chip-to-chip applications (400GAUI-4 C2C)
 Define a four-lane 400 Gbit/s PHY for operation over electrical backplanes an insertion loss ≤ 28 dB at 26.56 GHz (400GBASE-KR4)
 Define a four-lane 400 Gbit/s PHY for operation over twin axial copper cables with lengths up to at least 2 m (400GBASE-CR4)

802.3cm project 

 400 Gbit/s Ethernet
 Define a physical layer specification supporting 400 Gbit/s operation over 8 pairs of MMF with lengths up to at least 100 m (400GBASE-SR8)
Define a physical layer specification supporting 400 Gbit/s operation over 4 pairs of MMF with lengths up to at least 100 m (400GBASE-SR4.2)

802.3cn project 

 200 Gbit/s Ethernet
 Provide a physical layer specification supporting 200 Gbit/s operation over four wavelengths capable of at least 40 km of SMF (200GBASE-ER4) 
 400 Gbit/s Ethernet
 Provide a physical layer specification supporting 400 Gbit/s operation over eight wavelengths capable of at least 40 km of SMF (400GBASE-ER8)

802.3cu project 
 Define a four-wavelength 400 Gbit/s PHY for operation over SMF with lengths up to at least 2 km (400GBASE-FR4)
 Define a four-wavelength 400 Gbit/s PHY for operation over SMF with lengths up to at least 6 km (400GBASE-LR4-6)

802.3cw project 
 Provide a physical layer specification supporting 400 Gbit/s operation on a single wavelength capable of at least 80 km over a DWDM system (400GBASE-ZR) Dual polarization 16-state quadrature amplitude modulation (DP-16QAM) with coherent detection is proposed.

802.3db project 

 200 Gbit/s Ethernet
 Define a physical layer specification that supports 200 Gbit/s operation over 2 pairs of MMF with lengths up to at least 50 m (200GBASE-VR2)
 Define a physical layer specification that supports 200 Gbit/s operation over 2 pairs of MMF with lengths up to at least 100 m (200GBASE-SR2)
 400 Gbit/s Ethernet
 Define a physical layer specification that supports 400 Gbit/s operation over 4 pairs of MMF with lengths up to at least 50 m (400GBASE-VR4)
 Define a physical layer specification that supports 400 Gbit/s operation over 4 pairs of MMF with lengths up to at least 100 m (400GBASE-SR4)

'IEEE P802.3db 100 Gb/s, 200 Gb/s, and 400 Gb/s Short Reach Fiber Task Force'

802.3df project 
 Adds 800G Ethernet rate and specifies port types using existing 100G per lane technology

IEEE P802.3df Objectives for 800Gbit/s Ethernet and 400G and 800G PHYs using 100Gbit/s lanes

802.3dj project 
 Adds 1.6T Ethernet rate and specifies port types using new 200G per lane technology
IEEE P802.3dj Objectives for 1.6Tbit/s Ethernet and 200G, 400G 800 Gb/s, and 1.6 Tb/s PHYs using 200Gbit/s lanes

200G port types

400G port types

800G port types

See also 
 Ethernet Alliance
 Interconnect bottleneck
 Optical fiber cable
 Optical communication
 Parallel optical interface

References

Further reading 
 
 
 
 
 IEEE Reports

External links
 
 
 
 
 

Ethernet